The Dragon MSX MSX 1 home computer was designed by Radofin (the creators of the Mattel Aquarius) for Dragon Data, which were well known for their Dragon 64 home computer, a clone of the TRS-80 Color Computer. Only a few prototypes were ever built.

Tech information
 BIOS (16 KB)
 MSX BASIC V1.0 (16 KB)
 Video Display Processor: TMS9918 with a Video RAM of 16 KB and this BASIC modes :
SCREEN 0 : text 40 × 24 characters, 2 colors
SCREEN 1 : text 32 × 24 characters, 16 colors
SCREEN 2 : graphics 256 × 192, 16 colors
SCREEN 3 : graphics 64 × 48, 16 colors
 Sprites: 32, 1 colour, max 4 per horizontal line

External links
 El Museo de los 8 Bits
 Tromax happy proprietary of the prototype #37
Dragon Data Archive

MSX
Dragon Data